Georges Cattaui (14 September 1896 – 1974) was a French writer of Egyptian-Jewish origin. First cousin of Jean de Menasce, he belonged to the Jewish aristocracy of Alexandria, where he spent his first years.

Biography 
Born in Paris on 14 September 1896, Felix Georges Cattaui (son of Adolphe Cattaui and Rachel Francis), studied at the Lycée Carnot, and then studied law which opened his diplomatic career. He founded L'Atelier (the workshop) in Cairo and organized the third anniversary of the birth of Molière, then the popular university, a privileged place for French culture in Egypt. A secretary of King Fouad I he wrote the official speeches. He was secretary of the Legations in Prague, Bucharest and London. Between the two world wars, he took courses in theology at the University of Fribourg.

From 1936, he abandoned diplomacy and devoted himself to writing. After 1945, he wrote numerous columns in Le . Naturalized French he died in 1974 in Gland, Switzerland. From Jewish confession he had converted to Catholicism in April 1928.

While pursuing a career as a diplomat, he published several essays and biographies, particularly on Marcel Proust
In 1969 the Académie française bestowed him the Prix du rayonnement français.
In 1973 he obtained the prix Marcel Proust for his work Proust et ses métamorphoses.
His work Proust, documents iconographiques, published in 1956, remains the study of reference regarding the iconography of Marcel Proust.

Publications 
1925: Aux jeunes hommes d'Israël, n° 5, September 1925
1945: La Terre visitée, Égloff
1953: Marcel Proust, Proust et son Temps, Proust et le Temps, preface by Daniel-Rops, Éditions Julliard
1956: Proust, documents iconographiques, éditions Pierre Cailler, series "Visages d'hommes célèbres", 248 pages illustrated with 175 photos relating to Marcel Proust.
1958: T. S. Eliot, Éditions universitaires
1960: Jules Hardouin-Mansart
1960: Charles de Gaulle, l'homme et son destin, Fayard
1963: Proust perdu et retrouvé, Plon
1964: Constantine P. Cavafy
1964: Charles Péguy, témoin du temporel chrétien, Éditions du Centurion
1964: Léon Bloy, Éditions universitaires
1965: Orphisme et prophétie chez les poètes français 1850–1950, Plon
1971: Proust, Éditions universitaires, Le Livre de Poche
1973: L'Art baroque et rococo,
1973: Proust et ses métamorphoses, Nizet
1968: Actes du colloque de Cerisy devoted to Paul Claudel, under the direction of Georges Cattaui and Jacques Madaule

References

External links 
 HOMMAGE A GEORGES CATTAUI on Revue des deux Mondes (August 1983)
 Georges Cattaui on the site of the Académie française
 Georges cattaui on Gallimard
 1948 - Georges Cattaui  on Fribourg vu par les écrivains 1901–2000''

20th-century French writers
20th-century male writers
French biographers
Lycée Carnot alumni
English–French translators
1896 births
1974 deaths
Marcel Proust
Writers from Paris
Male biographers